Sue Anna Garina Dodd (born July 20, 1996), professionally known as Sue Ramirez, is a Filipino-American actress, model and singer. Her first major role was as supporting cast member on the ABS-CBN remake of the TV drama Mula Sa Puso (2011). She appeared in the television dramas Angelito: Batang Ama (2011–12), Angelito: Ang Bagong Yugto (2012), Annaliza (2013–2014), Pangako Sa 'Yo (2015), Dolce Amore (2016), La Luna Sangre (2017), Hanggang Saan (2017–18), FPJ's Ang Probinsyano (2018) and A Soldier's Heart (2020). She was nominated in the 32nd PMPC Star Awards for Movies as New Movie Actress of the Year for the film Just the Way You Are.

Early life
Sue Ramirez was born as Sue Anna Garina Dodd in Parañaque, Philippines. Her Filipino mother Concepcion Garina is from Sipalay City, Negros Occidental, and her father James Peter Dodd was a White American retired senior officer of the US state department. Sue is the youngest among her siblings, with two sisters and two brothers; only she has dual Filipino and American citizenship. She attended high school at Sacred Heart School in Parañaque. Ramirez's father died in 2013.

Career

2010–2012: Early work
In 2010, Ramirez auditioned for Star Magic with the song "Angels Brought Me Here" by Guy Sebastian, and was accepted, with her first project with ABS-CBN being teen variety show Shoutout! She entered show business with the hopes of paying for her father's medical expenses.

Ramirez began her acting career playing Nicole Matias in the ABS-CBN remake of Mula sa Puso. Her character is the only child of the antagonists Ysmael Matias and Selina Pereira-Matias, who goes against her parents and becomes associated with the protagonist, Olivia "Via" Pereira-Amarillo. The series premiered in March 2011 and ran for one season with ninety-eight episodes. Anna Larrucea was originally cast for her role. In the same year, Ramirez made her film debut with a minor role in Aswang, followed by a supporting role in ABS-CBN's drama television series Angelito: Batang Ama.

Ramirez's lead role in ABS-CBN's 2012 remake of !Oka Tokat is often cited as her second major role. She portrayed Luna, the clairvoyant haunted by her ability of foresight, who strives to hone and accept her ability while experiencing difficulties in belonging in the community. She was paired with Paul Salas as her first "love team" partner. The series premiered in February 2012 and ran for one season with fifteen episodes. In the same year, Ramirez reprised her role in the sequel to ABS-CBN's drama television series Angelito: Batang Ama, followed by a supporting role in an episode in ABS-CBN's anthology drama Maalaala Mo Kaya – Baul.

2013–2014: Further acting
In 2013, Ramirez starred as Luisa "Louie" Celerez in ABS-CBN's Annaliza, the remake of the television series of the same name produced by GMA Network. She was announced to be part of the supporting cast after ABS-CBN's announcement that they have received the rights to remake the television series from the original director, Gil C. Soriano.

In 2014, Ramirez appeared in another episode in ABS-CBN's anthology drama Maalaala Mo Kaya – Panyo, followed by a supporting role in an episode in ABS-CBN's dramatization of actual cases brought and settled in the Supreme Court and Court of Appeals, as well as a special participation in ABS-CBN's comedy drama Dream Dad.

2015–2017: Breakthrough
In 2015, Ramirez starred as Michelle Gutierrez in a series of episodes in ABS-CBN's Wansapanataym, followed by a special participation in the Nasaan Ka Nang Kailangan Kita remake of the film of the same name. In the same year, Ramirez participated in the fourth batch of the fifth season of Kapamilya, Deal or No Deal, hosted by Luis Manzano, where she was chosen to play in the May 13, 2015 episode and received ₱100,000. Ramirez once again appeared in two episodes in Maalaala Mo Kaya – Shattered Dreams and Maalaala Mo Kaya – Selfless Love and a supporting role in the afternoon drama series All of Me as Kristel Sebastian.

Ramirez gained further popularity after joining the second half (Book 2) of the teleserye Pangako Sa 'Yo (2015) as Joy "Ligaya" Miranda, the "third wheel" of the show's primary "love team" Yna Macaspac (Kathryn Bernardo) and Angelo Buenavista (Daniel Padilla). In the same year, Sue Ramirez received her first nomination in the 32nd PMPC Star Awards for Movies as New Movie Actress of the Year for the film Just the Way You Are (2015).

In 2016, Ramirez was given the role of Angel (Serena's biological sister played by Liza Soberano) in Dolce Amore and topbilled the viral story of Genesis, a Filipino artist who sold his paintings for a mother who suffered from severe illness in Maalaala Mo Kaya – Paru-paro. She also joined the longest-running musical variety show in the Philippines ASAP. In the same year, Ramirez was chosen to be the new Honorary Tourism Ambassador for Korea to the Philippines, replacing actress Jessy Mendiola.

Year after, Ramirez appeared as the Young Margaret Divinagracia played by Coney Reyes in 2017 Philippine fantasy drama My Dear Heart and as one of the celebrity contestants in the Philippine adaptation of Israeli reality show I Can Do That. In the same year, Ramirez had a reunion with the loveteam Kathniel in the horror-action fantasy drama television series La Luna Sangre.

In the last Quarter of 2017, Sue Ramirez led the cast of the horror movie The Debutantes together with Miles Ocampo, Michelle Vito, Jane de Leon and Chanel Morales. It was also announced that Ramirez will join the Main Cast of the Philippine television drama series Hanggang Saan with veteran actress Sylvia Sanchez and will be part of the 2017 Metro Manila Film Festival entry Meant to Beh: Ika-something na Utos with Vic Sotto and Dawn Zulueta.

2018-present: Current projects 
In 2018, she starred in a romantic movie with Jameson Blake titled Ang Babaeng Allergic sa WiFi.

In 2019, she portrayed a full-service sex worker in the film Cuddle Weather alongside RK Bagatsing.

She currently portrays Lexy Lucero, a woman in a relationship with a married man, in the Kapamilya teleserye The Broken Marriage Vow as main antagonist, which began airing in January 2022.

Personal life 
She was in a relationship with actor Joao Constancia from 2017 to 2019.

Since 2020, she has been dating actor and politician Javi Benitez, the son of politician Albee Benitez.

Filmography

Film

Television

Music video appearances

Awards

Discography

Major concerts

Music

Magazine cover

References

1996 births
Living people
Filipino people of American descent
Filipino child actresses
Filipino film actresses
Filipino television actresses
People from Negros Occidental
People from Parañaque
Star Magic
Star Music artists
ABS-CBN personalities
TV5 (Philippine TV network) personalities
Hiligaynon people
Tagalog people
21st-century Filipino singers
21st-century Filipino women singers